Montecalvoli is a village in Tuscany, central Italy, administratively a frazione of the comune of Santa Maria a Monte, province of Pisa. At the time of the 2001 census its population was 2,632.

Montecalvoli is about 25 km from Pisa and 4 km from Santa Maria a Monte.

References 

Frazioni of the Province of Pisa